Storm Seeker may refer to:

Storm Seeker (album), an album by ICS Vortex
 Storm Seeker (band), a German pirate-folk-metal-band